Sylvester Dzhibladze was a founder of the Social-Democratic movement in the Caucasus and one of Joseph Stalin's teachers. He went to the same seminary as Stalin and had hit his teacher for insulting the Georgian language. He was one of the leaders of the Social-Democratic organisation in Tiflis, Georgia. In July 1903, after spending a period of time in prison, he was banished to Eastern Siberia for three years, together with 15 other political prisoners, including Kurnatovsky, Franchesky and Joseph Djugashvili (Stalin).

References

Year of birth missing
Year of death missing
Social democrats from Georgia (country)